Mozyrsky Uyezd was one of the uyezds of Minsk Governorate and the Governorate-General of Minsk of the Russian Empire and then of Byelorussian Soviet Socialist Republic with its seat in Mozyr from 1793 until its formal abolition in 1924 by Soviet authorities.

Demographics
At the time of the Russian Empire Census of 1897, Mozyrsky Uyezd had a population of 181,161. Of these, 79.5% spoke Belarusian, 16.3% Yiddish, 2.1% Polish, 1.5% Russian, 0.3% German, 0.1% Ukrainian, 0.1% Latvian and 0.1% Czech as their first language.

References

 
Uezds of Minsk Governorate